Maewo-Naone Airport  is an airport on Maewo in Vanuatu.

Airlines and destinations

References

Airports in Vanuatu
Penama Province